Nalin Bhatt was a leader of Bharatiya Janata Party from Gujarat. He was a member of Gujarat Legislative Assembly and served as minister in Keshubhai Patel ministry.

References

2013 deaths
People from Vadodara
Bharatiya Janata Party politicians from Gujarat
Year of birth missing
Gujarat MLAs 1990–1995
Gujarat MLAs 1995–1998